The Arab League, formally the League of Arab States, is a regional organization in the Arab world, which is located in Northern Africa, Western Africa, Eastern Africa, and Western Asia. The Arab League was formed in Cairo on 22 March 1945, initially with six members: Egypt, Iraq, Transjordan (renamed Jordan in 1949), Lebanon, Saudi Arabia, and Syria. Yemen joined as a member on 5 May 1945. Currently, the League has 22 members, but Syria's participation has been suspended since November 2011.

The League's main goal is to "draw closer the relations between member states and co-ordinate collaboration between them, to safeguard their independence and sovereignty, and to consider in a general way the affairs and interests of the Arab countries". The organization has received a relatively low level of cooperation throughout its history.

Through institutions, notably the Arab League Educational, Cultural and Scientific Organization (ALECSO) and the Economic and Social Council of its Council of Arab Economic Unity (CAEU), the League facilitates political, economic, cultural, scientific, and social programmes designed to promote the interests of the Arab world. It has served as a forum for the member states to coordinate policy, arrange studies of and committees as to matters of common concern, settle inter-state disputes and limit conflicts such as the 1958 Lebanon crisis. The League has served as a platform for the drafting and conclusion of many landmark documents promoting economic integration. One example is the Joint Arab Economic Action Charter, which outlines the principles for economic activities in the region.

Each member state has one vote in the Council of the Arab League, and decisions are binding only for those states that have voted for them. The aims of the league in 1945 were to strengthen and coordinate the political, cultural, economic and social programs of its members and to mediate disputes among them or between them and third parties. Furthermore, the signing of an agreement on Joint Defence and Economic Cooperation on 13 April 1950 committed the signatories to coordination of military defence measures. In March 2015, the Arab League General Secretary announced the establishment of a Joint Arab Force with the aim of counteracting extremism and other threats to the Arab States. The decision was reached while Operation Decisive Storm was intensifying in Yemen. Participation in the project is voluntary, and the army intervenes only at the request of one of the member states. Heightened military arsenal in many member states and, in a small minority, civil wars as well as terrorist movements were the impetuts for the JAF, financed by the rich Gulf countries.

In the early 1970s, the Economic Council put forward a proposal to create the Joint Arab Chambers of Commerce across European states. That led, under its decree K1175/D52/G to the setting up of the Arab British Chamber of Commerce, mandated to promote, encourage and facilitate bilateral trade between the Arab world and significant trading partner, the United Kingdom.

History
Following adoption of the Alexandria Protocol in 1944, the Arab League was founded on 22 March 1945. The official headquarters of the League was the Boustan Palace in Cairo. It aimed to be a regional organisation of Arab states with a focus to developing the economy, resolving disputes and coordinating political aims. Other countries later joined the league. Each country was given one vote in the council. The first major action was the joint intervention, allegedly on behalf of the majority Arab population being uprooted as the state of Israel emerged in 1948 (and in response to popular protest in the Arab world), but a major participant in this intervention, Transjordan, had agreed with the Israelis to divide up the Arab Palestinian state proposed by the United Nations General Assembly, and Egypt intervened primarily to prevent its rival in Amman from accomplishing its objective. It was followed by the creation of a mutual defence treaty two years later. A common market was established in 1965.

The Arab League has achieved relatively low levels of cooperation throughout its history. According to Michael Barnett and Etel Solingen, the design of the Arab League reflects Arab leaders' individual concerns for regime survival: "the politics of Arab nationalism and a shared identity led Arab states to embrace the rhetoric of Arab unity in order to legitimize their regimes, and to fear Arab unity in practice because it would impose greater restrictions on their sovereignty." The Arab League was "specifically designed to fail at producing the kind of greater collaboration and integration that might have weakened political leaders at home."

Geography

The area largely consists of arid deserts, such as the Sahara. Nevertheless, it also contains several highly fertile lands like the Nile Valley, the Jubba Valley and Shebelle Valley in the Horn of Africa, the Atlas Mountains in the Maghreb, and the Fertile Crescent that stretches over Mesopotamia and the Levant. The area comprises deep forests in southern Arabia and parts of the world's longest river, the Nile.

Membership

The Charter of the Arab League, also known as the Pact of the League of Arab States, is the founding treaty of the Arab League. Adopted in 1945, it stipulates that "the League of Arab States shall be composed of the independent Arab States that have signed this Pact."

Initially, in 1945, there were only six members. Today, the Arab League has 22 members, including three African countries among the largest by area (Sudan, Algeria and Libya) and the largest country in Western Asia (Saudi Arabia).

There was a continual increase in membership during the second half of the 20th century. , there are 22 member states:

and 5 observer states (note: the below observer states have been invited to participate during select Arab League sessions, but do not hold voting privileges):

On 26 March 1979, Egypt was suspended from the Arab League due to the Egypt–Israel peace treaty; it was later readmitted on 23 May 1989.

Libya was suspended on 22 February 2011, following the start of the Libyan Civil War. The National Transitional Council, the partially recognised interim government of Libya, sent a representative to be seated at the Arab League meeting on 17 August to participate in a discussion as to whether to readmit Libya to the organisation.

Syria was suspended on 16 November 2011. On 6 March 2013, the Arab League gave the Syrian National Coalition Syria's seat in the Arab League. On 9 March 2014, secretary general Nabil al-Arabi said that Syria's seat would remain vacant until the opposition completes the formation of its institutions.

Politics and administration

The Arab League is a political organization which tries to help integrate its members economically, and solve conflicts involving member states without asking for foreign assistance. It possesses elements of a state representative parliament while foreign affairs are often conducted under UN supervision.

The Charter of the Arab League endorsed the principle of an Arab homeland while respecting the sovereignty of the individual member states. The internal regulations of the Council of the League and the committees were agreed in October 1951. Those of the Secretariat-General were agreed in May 1953.

Since then, governance of the Arab League has been based on the duality of supra-national institutions and the sovereignty of the member states. Preservation of individual statehood derived its strengths from the natural preference of ruling elites to maintain their power and independence in decision making. Moreover, the fear of the richer that the poorer may share their wealth in the name of Arab nationalism, the feuds among Arab rulers, and the influence of external powers that might oppose Arab unity can be seen as obstacles towards a deeper integration of the league.

Mindful of their previous announcements in support of the Arabs of Palestine the framers of the Pact were determined to include them within the League from its inauguration. This was done by means of an annex that declared:

At the Cairo Summit of 1964, the Arab League initiated the creation of an organisation representing the Palestinian people. The first Palestinian National Council convened in East Jerusalem on 29 May 1964. The Palestinian Liberation Organization was founded during this meeting on 2 June 1964. Palestine was shortly admitted in to the Arab League, represented by the PLO. Today, State of Palestine is a full member of the Arab League.

At the Beirut Summit on 28 March 2002, the league adopted the Arab Peace Initiative, a Saudi-inspired peace plan for the Arab–Israeli conflict. The initiative offered full normalisation of the relations with Israel. In exchange, Israel was required to withdraw from all occupied territories, including the Golan Heights, to recognise Palestinian independence in the West Bank and Gaza Strip, with East Jerusalem as its capital, as well as a "just solution" for the Palestinian refugees. The Peace Initiative was again endorsed at 2007 in the Riyadh Summit. In July 2007, the Arab League sent a mission, consisting of the Jordanian and Egyptian foreign ministers, to Israel to promote the initiative. Following Venezuela's move to expel Israeli diplomats amid the 2008–2009 Israel–Gaza conflict, Kuwaiti member of parliament Waleed Al-Tabtabaie proposed moving Arab League headquarters to Caracas, Venezuela. On 13 June 2010, Amr Mohammed Moussa, Secretary-General of the Arab League, visited the Gaza Strip, the first visit by an official of the Arab League since Hamas' armed takeover in 2007.

The Arab League is a member of the China-Arab States Cooperation Forum (CASCF), which was formed in 2004. CASCF is the Arab League's earliest participation in a cooperation forum with another country or region. CASCF is the primarily multi-lateral coordination mechanism between the Arab states and China and within CASCF the Arab League represents its member states as a relatively unified force. The Arab League's coordination allows Arab states to negotiate actively for collective projects involving multiple states, such as railway projects, nuclear power projects, and Dead Sea initiatives.

In 2015, the Arab League voiced support for Saudi Arabian-led military intervention in Yemen against the Shia Houthis and forces loyal to former President Ali Abdullah Saleh, who was deposed in the 2011 uprising.

On 15 April 2018, in response to the Turkish invasion of northern Syria aimed at ousting U.S.-backed Syrian Kurds from the enclave of Afrin, the Arab League passed a resolution calling on Turkish forces to withdraw from Afrin.

In September 2019, the Arab League condemned Benjamin Netanyahu's plans to annex the eastern portion of the occupied West Bank known as the Jordan Valley.

The Arab League met in Cairo on 12 October 2019 to discuss Turkish offensive into north-eastern Syria. Upon meeting, its member states voted to condemn the Turkish offensive, dubbing it both an 'invasion' and an 'aggression' against an Arab state, adding that the organization saw it as a violation of international law.

On 9 September 2020, the Arab League refused to condemn the UAE's decision to normalize ties with Israel. Nevertheless, "The goal all our Arab countries seek, without exception, is to end the occupation and establish an independent Palestinian state on the 1967 borders with East Jerusalem as its capital," Abul Gheit said.

Summits

Military

The Joint Defence Council of the Arab League is one of the Institutions of the Arab League. It was established under the terms of the Joint Defence and Economic Co-operation Treaty of 1950 to coordinate the joint defence of the Arab League member states.

The Arab League as an organisation has no military Force, similar to the UN, but at the 2007 summit, the Leaders decided to reactivate their joint defence and establish a peacekeeping force to deploy in South Lebanon, Darfur, Iraq, and other hot spots.

At a 2015 summit in Egypt, member states agreed in principle to form a joint military force.

Emergency summits

 Two summits are not added to the system of Arab League summits:
 Anshas, Egypt: 28–29 May 1946.
 Beirut, Lebanon: 13 – 15 November 1958.
 Summit 14 in Fes, Morocco, occurred in two stages:
 On 25 November 1981: the 5-hour meeting ended without an agreement on document.
 On 6–9 September 1982.

Economic resources

The Arab League is rich in resources, such as enormous oil and natural gas resources in certain member states. Another industry that is growing steadily in the Arab League is telecommunications. Within less than a decade, local companies such as Orascom and Etisalat have managed to compete internationally.

Economic achievements initiated by the League amongst member states have been less impressive than those achieved by smaller Arab organisations such as the Gulf Cooperation Council (GCC). Among them is the Arab Gas Pipeline, that will transport Egyptian and Iraqi gas to Jordan, Syria, Lebanon, and Turkey. As of 2013, a significant difference in economic conditions exist between the developed oil states of Algeria, Qatar, Kuwait and the UAE, and developing countries like the Comoros, Djibouti, Mauritania, Somalia, Sudan and Yemen.

The Arab League also includes great fertile lands in the southern part of Sudan. It is referred to as the food basket of the Arab World, the region's instability including the independence of South Sudan has not affected its tourism industry, that is considered the fastest growing industry in the region, with Egypt, UAE, Lebanon, Tunisia, and Jordan leading the way. Another industry that is growing steadily in the Arab League is telecommunications.

Economical achievements within members have been low in the league's history, other smaller Arab Organizations have achieved more than the league has, such as the GCC, but lately several major economic projects that are promising are to be completed, the Arab Gas Pipeline is to end by 2010, Connecting Egyptian and Iraqi Gas to Jordan, Syria and Lebanon, and then to Turkey thus Europe, a free trade Agreement (GAFTA) is to be completed by 1 January 2008, making 95% of all Arab Products tax free of customs.

Transport

The Arab League is divided into five parts when it comes to transport, with the Arabian Peninsula and the Near East being entirely connected by air, sea, roads and railways. Another part of the League is the Nile Valley, made up of Egypt and Sudan. These two member states have started to improve the River Nile's navigation system to improve accessibility and thus foster trading. A new railway system is also set to connect the southern Egyptian city of Abu Simbel with the northern Sudanese city of Wadi Halfa and then to Khartoum and Port Sudan. The third division of the League is the Maghreb, where a 3,000 km stretch of railway runs from the southern cities of Morocco to Tripoli in Western Libya. The fourth division of the League is the Horn of Africa, whose member states include Djibouti and Somalia. These two Arab League states are separated by only ten nautical miles from the Arabian Peninsula by the Bab el Mandeb and this is quickly changing as Tarik bin Laden, the brother of Osama bin Laden, has initiated the construction of the ambitious Bridge of the Horns project, which ultimately aims to connect the Horn of Africa with the Arabian Peninsula via a massive bridge. The project is intended to facilitate and accelerate the already centuries-old trade and commerce between the two regions. The last division of the League is the isolated island of the Comoros located off the coast of East Africa, which is not physically connected to any other Arab state, but still trades with other Arab League members.

Literacy

In collecting literacy data, many countries estimate the number of literate people based on self-reported data. Some use educational attainment data as a proxy, but measures of school attendance or grade completion may differ. Because definitions and data collection methods vary across countries, literacy estimates should be used with caution. United Nations Development Programme, Human Development Report 2010. It is also important to note that the Persian Gulf region has had an oil boom, enabling more schools and universities to be set up.

Demographics

The Arab League is a culturally and ethnically one association of 22 member states, with the overwhelming majority of the League's population identified as Arab (on a cultural ethnoracial basis). As of 1 July 2013, about 359 million people live in the states of the Arab League. Its population grows faster than in most other global regions. The most populous member state is Egypt, with a population of about 100 million. The least populated is the Comoros, with over 0.6 million inhabitants.

Syrian demographics are before the Syrian civil war.

Religion
The majority of the Arab League's citizens adhere to Islam, with Christianity being the second largest religion. At least 15 million Christians combined live in Egypt, Iraq, Jordan, Lebanon, Palestine, Sudan and Syria. In addition, there are smaller but significant numbers of Druze, Yazidis, Shabaks and Mandaeans. Numbers for nonreligious Arabs are generally not available, but research by the Pew Forum suggests around 1% of people in the MENA region are "unaffiliated".

Languages
The official language of the Arab League is Literary Arabic, based on Classical Arabic. However, several Arab League member states have other co-official or national languages, such as Somali, Afar, Comorian, French, English, Berber and Kurdish. In most countries, there is a dominant non-codified spoken Arabic dialect.

Culture

Sports

The Pan Arab Games are considered the biggest Arab sporting event, which brings together athletes from all the Arab countries to participate in a variety of different sports.

The Union of Arab Football Associations organises the Arab Cup (for national teams) and the Arab Club Champions Cup (for clubs). Arab sport federations also exist for several games, include basketball, volleyball, handball, table tennis, tennis, squash and swimming.

See also

Arab Charter on Human Rights
Arab Cold War
Arab Fund for Economic and Social Development (AFESD)
 Arab leaders
Arab League and the Arab–Israeli conflict
Arab League boycott of Israel
Arab Maghreb Union (UMA)
Arab Monetary Fund
Arab Organization for Industrialization
Arab Parliament
Arab Union
Bloudan Conference of 1937
Bloudan Conference of 1946
Council of Arab Economic Unity (CAEU)
Flag of the Arab League
General Arab Insurance Federation
General Union of Chambers of Commerce, Industry and Agriculture for Arab Countries
Gulf Cooperation Council (GCC)
Inshas
International Association of Arabic Dialectology (AIDA)
International Confederation of Arab Trade Unions
List of conflicts in the Arab League
List of country groupings
List of largest cities in the Arab world
List of multilateral free-trade agreements
Lists of the Arab League
Model Arab League
Orange card system – motor insurance scheme of the Arab League
Organisation of Islamic Cooperation
Organization of Arab Petroleum Exporting Countries (OAPEC)
Organization of the Petroleum Exporting Countries (OPEC)
Pan Arab Games
Pan-Arabism
Summit of South American-Arab Countries
United Arab Command
Arab Standardization and Metrology Organization

References

External links

  The League of Arab States (official site).
  League of Arab States Office  in Washington D.C. – USA
 The League of Arab States at Al-Bab.com
 The Arab League at Council on Foreign Relations
 Profile: Arab League, BBC News, updated 9 August 2011
 Arab League Summit 2013 in Qatar 
 Arab Turk Conference and Expo at Bursa
 
 
 

 
League
International organizations based in Africa
International organizations based in Asia
International organizations based in the Middle East
Supranational unions
Intergovernmental organizations established by treaty
Organisations based in Cairo
Organizations established in 1945
1945 establishments in Africa
1945 establishments in Asia
1945 establishments in Egypt
1940s in Islam